Prince Dominik Rainer Radziwiłł (22 January 1911 – 19 November 1976) was a Polish aristocrat and officer of the Polish Army.

His father, Prince Hieronim Mikołaj Radziwiłł, was deported to a gulag during the Soviet occupation of Poland and died on 6 April 1945.

Marriage and issue 

He married Princess Eugénie of Greece and Denmark, on 30 May 1938 in Paris, from whom he was divorced in 1946, and had children:
 Tatiana Maria Renata Eugenia Elisabeth Margarete Radziwiłł (b. 28 August 1939); married Dr. Jean Henri Fruchaud on 24 March 1966. Tatiana was a bridesmaid at the 1962 wedding of the future King Juan Carlos I of Spain and Princess Sophia of Greece and Denmark and at the 1964 wedding of King Constantine II of Greece and Princess Anne-Marie of Denmark. 
  Jerzy (George) Andrzej Dominik Hieronim Piotr Leon Radziwiłł (4 November 1942 – 27 August 2001).

His second wife was Lida Lacey Bloodgood (b. 1 February 1923, New York, - d. 31 July 2008, Rome, Italy), daughter of John Van Schaick Bloodgood and Lida Fleitmann Bloodgood), married on 8 January 1947 in Rome. They had children:
  Lida Maria Renata Radziwiłł (11 July 1954, Cape Town – 5 May 2014); married Swiss banker André Wagnière, on 30 October 1976  (divorced).
  Maria Ludwika (Louise) Jadwiga Radziwiłł (b. 23 January 1956); married Sicilian aristocrat Don Antonio Moncada, Nobile dei Principi of Paternò, on 4 October 1987.
  Lida (Lyda) Dominika Radziwiłł (b. 29 August 1959); married Roman aristocrat Prince Innocenzo Odescalchi in 1991.

References

1911 births
1976 deaths
Dominik Rainer
Polish Army officers